Sampson is an unincorporated community in Oconto County, Wisconsin, United States. The community is located at the intersection of Oconto County Highways C and D, in the town of Morgan. It is located at latitude 44.765 and longitude -88.186 and elevation 787 feet (mean sea level). In the unincorporated limits there is The Hilltop Tavern, a county highway shop and Sampson Valley Vineyard.

the land that comprises Sampson is the terminal moraine of the last glaciation.  Over 200 feet of rich glacial till is present attracting over 1/2 dozen gravel operations supplying many concrete and road building companies.

when the federal govt signed the last treaty with the Menominee nation in 1838 it paved the way for statehood. But the state and federal govt had very few settlers to tax.  When the sturgeon bay ship canal was constructed, the federal govt paid the investors with this newly acquired land which included the land at Sampson.  The investors then sold it to immigrants from mainly Poland and Germany looking to create farms.

Images

References

Unincorporated communities in Oconto County, Wisconsin
Unincorporated communities in Wisconsin